Anna Heilferty (born April 17, 1999) is an American professional soccer player for Washington Spirit of the National Women's Soccer League (NWSL).

Club career 
Heilferty made her professional debut on April 10, 2021, in the NWSL Challenge Cup.

Career statistics

College

Club

References

External links 
 Boston University profile

Living people
1999 births
Washington Spirit players
Boston University Terriers women's soccer players
Washington Spirit draft picks
American women's soccer players
Women's association football midfielders
National Women's Soccer League players